Bruce Li (born Ho Chung-tao; 5 June 1950) is a Taiwanese actor and martial artist. He is a Bruce Lee imitator who starred in martial arts films from the Bruceploitation movement.

Career

He went to play a stuntman in Taiwan and Hong Kong under the name of James Ho.

After the death of Bruce Lee, Ho Chung-tao's acting career began. Hong Kong studios noticed that Ho resembled the kung fu star. They first employed him in Conspiracy. Afterwards, the producers of Game of Death asked him to finish their movie in Lee's role, but Ho declined the offer.

After this, Ho was employed by producer actor Jimmy Shaw who gave him the name of Bruce Li.

While Ho was finishing his military service, he appeared in Goodbye Bruce Lee: His Last Game of Death. He would star in other Bruceploitation pictures in 1976 with The Young Bruce Lee and Bruce Lee: The Man, The Myth.

Under the name "Bruce Li", some Taiwanese and Hong Kong producers decided to directly credit him as "Bruce Lee", even going so far as to use the real Bruce Lee's picture on posters. Li even appeared in Bruce Lee Against Supermen where he stars as Kato, assistant of the Green Hornet, a role originally played by the real Bruce Lee.

In 1975, Dragon Dies Hard became a hit in Japan, where it earned  at the box office.

The producers really wanted to show Li as the "official" successor of Bruce Lee. In the 1976 movie Exit the Dragon, Enter the Tiger, Li meets Lee who points to him as the one who shall replace him. Li was dubbed the "Tiger" to Lee's "Dragon". Li appeared in Return of the Tiger, starring Angela Mao. In it, Bruce Li fights Paul L. Smith.

Ho carried on by playing in two unofficial sequels to Bruce Lee's classic Fist of Fury.

In 1976, Ho reprised his role as Bruce Lee in Bruce Lee: The True Story (also known as Bruce Lee: The Man, The Myth), a biography film. Li choreographed the combat sequences himself. Being very successful, fans recognize it as one of the best biopics of Bruce Lee.

Ho kept shooting martial arts movies until the 1980s. He also directed movies, including the 1981 film The Chinese Stuntman.

Ho eventually ran into trouble separating himself from his Bruce Lee roles, along with standing out from the other impersonators in the Bruceploitation genre. In 1985, Ho ended his career after his wife's death. He returned to Taiwan to become a physical education instructor at Taipei's Ping Chung University. He also has taught martial arts for comedian apprentices. Since then, he has appeared only very briefly in martial arts cinema or Bruce Lee documentaries.

In 1990, Li retired from acting at the age of 40.

Bruce Li's career was the focus of a segment of the 1995 documentary Top Fighter. In the segment, he stated that he was unhappy that the studios wanted to turn him into a Bruce Lee marketing gimmick, saying "I could act like him but I could never be him."

Filmography

Movies
 Rickshaw Man (1974) (a.k.a. Rickshaw Driver, Shaolin Kung Fu)
 Bruce Lee: A Dragon Story (1974) (a.k.a. Super Dragon: The Bruce Lee Story and Bruce Lee Story: Super Dragon)
 Iron Man (1975)
 Goodbye Bruce Lee: His Last Game of Death (1975)
 Bruce Lee Against Supermen (1975)
 Bruce Lee, We Miss You (1975) (a.k.a. Dragon Dies Hard)
 Bruce Lee: The Man, The Myth (1976)
 Exit the Dragon, Enter the Tiger (1976)
 Enter the Panther (1976)
 Bruce Lee's Secret (1976) (a.k.a. Bruce Lee's Deadly Kung Fu and Story of the Dragon)
 The Ming Patriots (1977) (a.k.a. Revenge of the Patriots)
 Bruce Li in New Guinea (1977)
 Bruce Lee the Invincible (1977)
 The Dragon Lives (1977)
 Fist of Fury II (1977) (a.k.a. Chinese Connection 2 and Fist of Fury Part II)
 Soul Brothers of Kung Fu (1978)
 The Image of Bruce Lee (1978) (a.k.a. Storming Attacks)
 Fists of Bruce Lee (1978)
 Edge of Fury (1978)
 Dynamo (1978)
 Deadly Strike (1978) (a.k.a. Wanted! Bruce Li, Dead or Alive)
 Bruce Li's Magnum Fist (1978)
 Bruce Lee vs. the Iron Dragon (1978)
 Return of the Tiger (1978)
 Bruce Against Iron Hand (1979)
 The Lama Avenger (1979) (a.k.a. The Three Avengers)
 Fist of Fury III (1979) (a.k.a. Chinese Connection III)
 The Iron Dragon Strikes Back (1979)
 Blind Fist of Bruce (1979) (prior title Mang quan gui shou)
 The Chinese Stuntman (1981)
 Powerforce (1982)

Documentary
 The Young Bruce Lee (1976) a.k.a. The Little Dragon
 The Real Bruce Lee (1977)

References

External links
 Bruce Li - Featured in Bruceploitation Series on GooHead
 
 Clones of Bruce Lee – The Ultimate Guide To Bruce Lee Exploitation Cinema

Hong Kong male actors
Hong Kong stunt performers
Taiwanese stunt performers
Bruce Lee imitators
1950 births
Living people